Braydon Side is a farming hamlet in Wiltshire, England, in the parish of Brinkworth.

Hamlets in Wiltshire